Gear shaping is a machining process for creating teeth on a gear using a cutter. Gear shaping is a convenient and versatile method of gear cutting. It involves continuous, same-plane rotational cutting of gear.

Process theory

The types of cutters used for gear shaping can be grouped into four categories: disk, hub, shank, and helical cutters. The cutters are essentially gears that are used to form the teeth. This method of gear cutting is based on the principle that any two gears will mesh if they are of the same pitch, proper helix angle, and proper tooth depth and thickness.

Process characteristics
By using a gear-shaped corresponding cutter that is rotated (in relation to a blank gear) produces the gear teeth. The cutters that are rotated are timed with the workpiece.  This process produces internal gears, external gears, and integral gear-pinion arrangements.

Process schematic
The process of gear shaping uses a toothed disk cutter which reciprocates in axial rotations. The workpiece (or blank gear) rotates on a second shaft (spindle). The workpiece is aligned with the cutter and it gradually feeds into the cutter while rotating. If a two-step process is used, all tooth spaces are partially cut before finishing.

Setup and equipment
The machine used for gear shaping generally consists of a base, column spindle, and an arbor. The gear cutter is mounted on the spindle, and the gear blank is mounted on the arbor. The cutter reciprocates up and down while the workpiece is gradually fed into the cutter. At the end of each cutting rotation, the spindle is retracted slightly to discourage any more cutting into the new cut teeth of the gear.

References
 Todd, R (1994). "Gear Shaping", Manufacturing Processes Reference Guide.
 Gear Shaping Machines. Retrieved on January 13, 2009.

Notes

Gears